Port Augusta Power Station may refer to:
Playford A Power Station, built in 1954
Playford B Power Station (South Australia), built in 1963
Northern Power Station (South Australia), built in 1985.